The Sonata in E-flat major (Hob. XVI/38, L. 51) is a keyboard sonata composed by Joseph Haydn. It is also referred to as a piano sonata. The three-movement work was published by Artaria in 1780 in a set of six sonatas dedicated to the sisters Katharina and Marianna Auenbrugger.

The sonata has three movements:
Allegro moderato (E-flat major)
Adagio (C minor)
Finale: Allegro (E-flat major)

The first movement is in sonata form. It is monothematic, in that the movement only presents and significantly develops one distinct theme.

The second movement is a siciliana. The third is in da capo form, akin to a minuet and trio. The two movements are linked by an attacca direction: the second movement has an open ending on a G-major chord; the third movement follows immediately, and that chord becomes the submediant triad (with raised third) of the new movement's key of E-flat major.

References

External links 
Franz Joseph Haydn (1732-1809) - Sonate in Es-Dur, Hob XVI:38

Piano sonatas by Joseph Haydn
Compositions in E-flat major